Pervoye Maya is a rural locality (a settlement) in Tatarobashmakovsky Selsoviet, Privolzhsky District, Astrakhan Oblast, Russia. The population was 127 as of 2010. There are 4 streets.

Geography 
Pervoye Maya is located 34 km southwest of Nachalovo (the district's administrative centre) by road. Tatarskaya Bashmakovka is the nearest rural locality.

References 

Rural localities in Privolzhsky District, Astrakhan Oblast